Esteban Crespo (born June 10, 1971) is a Spanish film maker. Crespo was nominated for an Academy Award for Best Live Action Short Film for the 2013 film Aquel no era yo (That Wasn't Me).

References

External links
 

1971 births
Living people
Spanish film directors
People from Madrid